Darrell Kenyatta Malone (born November 23, 1967) is a former American football cornerback who played in the National Football League. He played college football at Jacksonville State University in Jacksonville, Alabama. Malone was drafted by the Kansas City Chiefs in the 6th round (162nd overall) of the 1991 NFL Draft. He played for the Kansas City Chiefs (1992) and the Miami Dolphins (1992–1994).

References

External links
The Greatest Kansas City Chiefs, By the Numbers: #42

1967 births
Living people
Sportspeople from Mobile, Alabama
Players of American football from Alabama
American football cornerbacks
Jacksonville State Gamecocks football players
Kansas City Chiefs players
Miami Dolphins players
People from Jacksonville, Alabama